James Cruz is a Grammy Award winning audio mastering engineer and owner of Zeitgeist Sound Studios in Long Island City, New York.

Biography
James Cruz started his career in 2002, at The Hit Factory during its "golden age" under the tutelage of Tom Coyne, Chris Gehringer and Herb Powers Jr. While there he mastered records for artists such as Lil' Kim, Toni Braxton, Mary Mary, Maxwell and Outkast.

After The Hit Factory, James moved to Sony Studios as a senior mastering engineer. There he worked on artists such as Natasha Bedingfield, Calle 13 and Lil Wayne. He also gained an international following with clients from Serbia, England, Australia and Japan.

In 2008, James opened Zeitgeist Sound Studios in Long Island City, New York. It's here that he won his first Latin Grammy for mastering "Los De Atras Vienen Conmigo" by Calle 13.

In 2011, The album "Entren Los Que Quieran" by Calle 13 was mastered by James Cruz and won a record setting 9 Latin Grammys including Album of the year.

Awards
Latin Grammy: Calle 13- Album Of The Year "Entren Los Que Quieran" 2011

Grammy: Calle 13- Best Latin Rock/Alt/Urban Album "Los De Atras Vienen Conmigo" 2009

Grammy: Mary Mary- Best Gospel Song "God In Me" 2009

Latin Grammy: Calle 13- Album Of The Year 2009 "Los De Atras Vienen Conmigo"

Grammy: Mary Mary- Best Contemporary Soul Gospel Album "Thankful" 2000

Latin Grammy: Calle 13- Best Urban Music Album "Residente O Visitante" 2007

Sources
1. http://mixonline.com/recording/mastering/mastering-another-gray-area-1209/index.html
2. http://mixonline.com/mag/audio_hidden_sony_masters/index.html
3. http://www.prosoundnews.com/article/26688
4. http://www.zeitgeistsound.com
5. 
6. Recording Magazine, April, 2010

American audio engineers
Living people
Latin Grammy Award winners
Year of birth missing (living people)